Cláudio Pereira da Silva Júnior (born 2 September 1991), known as Claudinho, is a Brazilian footballer who plays for Guarani as a forward.

Career statistics

References

External links

1991 births
Living people
Footballers from Rio de Janeiro (city)
Brazilian footballers
Association football forwards
Campeonato Brasileiro Série B players
Campeonato Brasileiro Série D players
Ituano FC players